The Anglican Bishop of Leeds is the ordinary of the Church of England Diocese of Leeds in the Province of York.

The diocese and see were created by The Dioceses of Bradford, Ripon and Leeds and Wakefield Reorganisation Scheme 2013 on 20 April 2014. Nick Baines became diocesan and area bishop of Leeds upon the confirmation of his election on 8 June 2014; but he acted as diocesan and area bishop from 22 April 2014. The bishop's residence is Hollin House, in the Far Headingley area of Leeds.

List of bishops

References